Kremeriella is a monotypic genus of flowering plants belonging to the family Brassicaceae. It has one known synonym Kremeria . It only contains one species, Kremeriella cordylocarpus (Coss. & Durieu) Maire 

Its native range is north-western Africa. It is found in Algeria and Morocco.

The genus name of Kremeriella is in honour of Jean Pierre Kremer (1812–1867), a French doctor and botanist from Metz. The Latin specific epithet of cordylocarpus is derived from 2 words, cordylo an Ancient Greek word for a club (kordyle), and also "carpus" is derived from the Latin carpus and the Greek καρπός (karpós), meaning "wrist".
Both genus and species were first described and published in É.Jahandiez & al., Cat. Pl. Maroc Vol.2 on page 293 in 1932.

References

Brassicaceae
Brassicaceae genera
Plants described in 1932
Flora of Algeria
Flora of Morocco